Reezal Merican bin Naina Merican (born 29 July 1972) is a Malaysian politician and banker who served as the Minister of Housing and Local Government in the Barisan Nasional (BN) administration under former Prime Minister Ismail Sabri Yaakob from August 2021 to the collapse of the BN administration in November 2022, the Minister of Youth and Sports in the Perikatan Nasional (PN) administration under former Prime Minister Muhyiddin Yassin from March 2020 to the collapse of the PN administration in August 2021 and the Member of Parliament (MP) for Kepala Batas from May 2013 after the retirement of 5th and former Prime Minister Abdullah Ahmad Badawi as the MP from politics to his electoral defeat in November 2022. He is also a member of the Supreme Council of the United Malays National Organisation (UMNO). He is an ethnic Malay of mixed Indian descent.

Before entering Parliament, Reezal worked in the bank sector. Reezal took over Abdullah as the party's Division Head of Kepala Batas and as the Barisan Nasional (BN) candidate for the parliamentary seat. Reezal won the seat in the 2013 Malaysian general election while defeated a candidate from the Malaysian Islamic Party (PAS) by 4,176 majority of the votes. In October 2013, he was elected to Supreme Council of UMNO, the highest-ranking body of the party.
In a Cabinet reshuffle on 28 July 2015, Reezal was handpicked as Deputy Minister of Foreign Affairs by former Prime Minister Najib Razak. Despite winning the majority to defend his seat in his parliamentary constituency, Reezal lost his Cabinet post following the results of the 2018 Malaysian general election.

Controversy
On 29 August 2015, Reezal intimidated Malaysians participating in the Bersih 4 demonstrations abroad that the Foreign Ministry would gather their information for eventual legal action against them, without even citing which law the citizen abroad violated.

Family
After first wife Ismalina Ismail and second wife Sharifah Norhaslinda which once filed for divorce with Reezal but retracted.

Election results

Honours
  :
  Knight Companion of the Order of the Crown of Pahang (DIMP) – Dato' (2006)
  Grand Knight of the Order of Sultan Ahmad Shah of Pahang (SSAP) – Dato' Sri (2008)

See also
 Kepala Batas (federal constituency)

References

1972 births
Living people
Malaysian people of Malay descent
Malaysian politicians of Indian descent
Malaysian Muslims
United Malays National Organisation politicians
Members of the Dewan Rakyat
21st-century Malaysian politicians
Ministry of Housing and Local Government (Malaysia)